"Never Knew Love Like This" is a top ten US R&B hit, and a top ten UK hit song duetted by American R&B singers Cherrelle and Alexander O'Neal; released in 1988. The song peaked at #2 in the US R&B chart, #26 in the UK and #28 in the Billboard Hot 100.

It was the second time Alexander O'Neal and Cherrelle sang together. They sang "Saturday Love" together in 1985 on Cherrelle's gold album High Priority. "Never Knew Love Like This" is featured on Alexander O'Neal's 3× platinum album Hearsay which was released in 1987. The music video was filmed in London.

Track listing
 12" Maxi (Tabu TBU 651369 6)
"Never Knew Love Like This (Extended Version)" - 5:40
"Never Knew Love Like This (A Cappella)" - 3:30
"Never Knew Love Like This (Instrumental)" - 5:25
"Never Knew Love Like This (Reprise)" - 3:30

 12" Maxi Promo (Tabu ZAS 1049)
"Never Knew Love Like This (Saturday Mix)" - 6:53
"Never Knew Love Like This (Saturday Instrumental)" - 6:53
"Never Knew Love Like This (Street Mix)" - 4:57
"Never Knew Love Like This (Dubstrumental)" - 8:09

 7" Single (Tabu ZS4 07646)
"Never Knew Love Like This" - 3:22
"What's Missing" - 4:02

 CD Single (Tabu 651382 2)
"Never Knew Love Like This (Extended Version)" - 5:40
"Never Knew Love Like This (Instrumental)" - 5:25
"Never Knew Love Like This (Reprise)" - 3:30

Personnel
Credits are adapted from the album's liner notes.
 Alexander O'Neal - lead vocals
 Jimmy Jam - drum and keyboard programming, keyboards, percussion
 Terry Lewis - percussion, backing vocals
 Cherrelle - lead and backing vocals
 Randy Ran - backing vocals
 David Eiland - saxophone solo

Sales chart performance

Peak positions

Covers
The song was covered by Pauline Henry featuring Wayne Marshall in 1996. It managed to enter the UK Singles Chart top 40, peaking at No. 40.

References

External links
 

1988 singles
Alexander O'Neal songs
Cherrelle songs
Male–female vocal duets
Pauline Henry songs
Songs written by Jimmy Jam and Terry Lewis
Song recordings produced by Jimmy Jam and Terry Lewis
1987 songs
Tabu Records singles